Ommatissopyrops is a genus of moths in the Epipyropidae family.

Species
Ommatissopyrops lusitanicus Bivar de Sousa & Quartau, 1998
Ommatissopyrops schawerdae (Zerny, 1929)

References

Epipyropidae
Zygaenoidea genera